Live at The Fillmore Auditorium is a live DVD concert of the band, Widespread Panic, filmed at The Fillmore Auditorium in Denver, CO between February 10–12, 2012.

Track listing

February 10, 2012

Disc one
 From The Cradle
 Can't Get High
 Worry
 Clinic Cynic
 St. Louis
 Wondering
 Gradle
 This Part of Town
 Don't Wanna Lose You
 Imitation Leather Shoes
 Holden Oversoul
 Who Do You Belong To?
 Travelin' Man

Disc two
 Party at Your Mama's House
 Stop Breakin' Down
 Christmas Katie
 Good Morning Little Schoolgirl
 Pickin' Up The Pieces
 Nobody's Loss
 Space Wrangler
 Climb To Safety
 Don't Be Denied
 Up All Night
 Chunk of Coal

February 11, 2012

Disc one
 Henry Parson's Died
 Heaven
 Tickle The Truth
 Shut Up and Drive
 Aunt Avis
 Help Me Somebody
 Saint Ex
 Let's Get The Show On The Road
 Tail Dragger
 Tall Boy

Disc two
 Fishing
 C. Brown
 Papa Johnny Road
 Mercy
 Jack
 Ride Me High
 Driving Song
 Papa's Home
 Driving Song

Disc three
 Ribs and Whiskey
 Dang Me
 And It Stoned Me
 Mr. Soul

February 12, 2012

Disc one
 Hope In A Hopeless World
 Porch Song
 Ain't Life Grand
 Time Waits For No One
 Time Waits
 Time Zones
 Carmelita
 True To My Nature
 Visiting Day
 Makes Sense To Me
 Surprise Valley
 Pilgrims
 Crazy

Disc two
 Contentment Blues
 Low Spark of High Heeled Boys
 Airplane
 Dream Song
 Blight 
 Travelin' Light
 Blackout Blues
 When You Coming Hone
 Many Rivers To Cross
 You Can't Always Get What You Want

Personnel 
 John Bell – vocals and guitar
 John "JoJo" Hermann – keyboards and vocals
 Jimmy Herring – guitar
 Todd Nance – drums and vocals
 Domingo S. Ortiz – percussion and vocals
 Dave Schools – bass and vocals

References 

Widespread Panic video albums
2012 live albums
2012 video albums
Live video albums